Jairzinho & Simony is the only studio album by Simony and Jairzinho. The album was popular in Brazilian and Spanish speaking markets. This the only album the duo would ever make.

Reception

The album sold 600,000 in Brazil by 1987.

References 

1987 albums
Portuguese-language albums
CBS Records albums
Spanish-language albums
Children's music albums